Lophocampa sobrina is a moth of the family Erebidae. It was described by Stretch in 1872. It is found in California, United States.

References

 Natural History Museum Lepidoptera generic names catalog

sobrina
Moths described in 1872